Milovan Milović (born 24 October 1980) is a Serbian football manager and former player. He is the manager of Javor Ivanjica.

Throughout his playing career, Milović made over 400 appearances for Javor Ivanjica across all competitions.

Club career
Milović started out at his hometown club Javor Ivanjica, aged 7. He went through all youth ranks, before being promoted to the senior squad in 1999. Over the course of the next four seasons, Milović established himself as a regular member of the team, before transferring to Partizan in June 2003. He spent half of his four-year contract on loans at other clubs, including spells with Obilić, Javor Ivanjica and Bežanija.

In the summer of 2007, Milović moved back to his former club Javor Ivanjica. He was later loaned to OFK Beograd in January 2008, but appeared in just five league matches with the Romantičari, before returning to his parent club. In June 2010, Milović signed a two-year contract with Vojvodina. He then went abroad on loan to Albanian club Dinamo Tirana in January 2011. Subsequently, Milović played for Javor Ivanjica in the first half of the 2011–12 season, before rejoining Vojvodina.

In the summer of 2012, Milović made another return to Javor Ivanjica. He captained the side to the final of the 2015–16 Serbian Cup, an eventual 0–2 loss against Partizan.

International career
Milović made one appearance for Serbia, playing the full 90 minutes in a 3–0 away friendly win over Japan on 7 April 2010.

Managerial career
In May 2018, after previously serving as an assistant to Vlado Jagodić, Milović was appointed caretaker manager of Javor Ivanjica until the end of the season.

Career statistics

Honours
Javor Ivanjica
 Second League of FR Yugoslavia: 2001–02
 Serbian Cup: Runner-up 2015–16
Partizan
 First League of Serbia and Montenegro: 2004–05
Dinamo Tirana
 Albanian Cup: Runner-up 2010–11

References

External links
 
 
 
 

Association football defenders
Expatriate footballers in Albania
First League of Serbia and Montenegro players
FK Bežanija players
FK Dinamo Tirana players
FK Javor Ivanjica managers
FK Javor Ivanjica players
FK Obilić players
FK Partizan players
FK Vojvodina players
Kategoria Superiore players
OFK Beograd players
People from Ivanjica
Second League of Serbia and Montenegro players
Serbia and Montenegro footballers
Serbia international footballers
Serbian expatriate footballers
Serbian expatriate sportspeople in Albania
Serbian First League players
Serbian football managers
Serbian footballers
Serbian SuperLiga managers
Serbian SuperLiga players
1980 births
Living people